James Robertson was a British automobile manufacturer from 1915 to 1916 in Manchester.

References

Sources
Harald Linz and Halwart Schrader: The International Motor encyclopedia. : United Soft Media Verlag GmbH, Munich 2008, 
Nick Georgano: . The Beaulieu Encyclopedia of the Automobile, Volume 3 P-Z Fitzroy Dearborn Publishers, Chicago 2001,  (English)
David Culshaw & Peter Horrobin: The Complete Catalogue of British Cars 1895-1975 . Veloce Publishing plc. Dorchester (1997). 

Cyclecars
Defunct motor vehicle manufacturers of England
Defunct companies based in Manchester